Old Gimmestad Church is a former (historic) parish church of the Church of Norway in Gloppen Municipality in Vestland county, Norway. It is located in the village of Sørstranda. It was once the church for the Gimmestad parish which is part of the Nordfjord prosti (deanery) in the Diocese of Bjørgvin, but it now serves mostly as a museum. The red, wooden church was built in a long church style in 1692 by an unknown architect. The church seats about 80 people.

The church was in regular use until 1910 when the new Gimmestad Church was completed. Since 1910, the church has been preserved as a historic site and is occasionally used for religious services or weddings.

History
The earliest existing historical records of the church date back to the year 1308, but it was not a new church at that time. The first church in Gimmestad was a wooden stave church. In 1650, the old church was in such poor condition that it was decided to tear down the old building and to rebuild a new church on the same site. So, in 1652 the old church was torn down and a new timber-framed building was constructed. Unfortunately, the new building was not a high quality building because in December 1690, the church took on significant damage during a winter storm, with the wind severely damaging the building. In 1692, the church was torn down and replaced with a new building on the same site.

The building from 1692 still stands today. It is representative of typical Norwegian church architecture from the period after the Reformation. Although changes were made to its walls, the church has retained most of its original features. The most significant change was made around 1720, when the church was painted red and embellished with flower motifs. During that same renovation project the ceiling was painted blue and stars were drawn on it. At the back of the church building is a christening house or front house. In the old days, babies were christened in this room. It was the custom in those days to then carry the baby from this room to the altar.

By the early 1900s, the church was too small for the congregation and many in the parish chose to attend the larger Vereide Church on the other side of the fjord. In 1902, the Church Ministry decided that the church should be torn down and replaced, but due to local opposition, the church was preserved as a museum and a new church was to be built nearby. After the new church was completed in 1910, it became the main church for the parish and the old church was taken out of regular use. It is now used mostly as a museum, but on special occasions it is still used as a church. In 1914–1915, the old church was restored according to plans by Kristen Rivertz. In the 1960s, the church was restored again according to plans by Egill Reimers, and Bjørn Kaland restored the interior painting and decorations on the walls and ceiling.

Media gallery

See also
List of churches in Bjørgvin

References

Gloppen
Churches in Vestland
Long churches in Norway
Wooden churches in Norway
17th-century Church of Norway church buildings
Churches completed in 1692
13th-century establishments in Norway